Michipicoten (named Elton Hoyt II when it entered service in 1952) is a self-discharging lake freighter owned and operated by Canadian shipping firm Lower Lakes Towing. Michipicoten primarily hauls taconite from Marquette, Michigan, to the Algoma Steel Mill in Sault Ste. Marie, Ontario.

Construction 
Michipicoten was built in 1952 by Massachusetts Heavy Industries in Quincy, Massachusetts. It was one of three vessels built to similar plans for the Interlake Steamship Company. It was launched as Elton Hoyt II. The other two vessels, Johnstown and Sparrows Point, were built for the Bethlehem Steel Corporation.

All three ships were brought to the Great Lakes via the Mississippi and Illinois rivers, restricting their size. It was powered by a  Bethlehem Steel cross compound steam turbine and two oil-fired Foster-Wheeler water tube boilers. As Elton Hoyt II was brought through the rivers, its cabins and pilothouse were cut off and carried on-deck. It was assembled in Chicago, and entered service on August 15, 1952.

Service history 
Over the course of the next nearly two decades, Elton Hoyt II entered a pattern of shipping iron ore from Duluth, Minnesota, or Superior, Wisconsin, to a number of ports in the lower Great Lakes.

Throughout the 1950s, Elton Hoyt II had an incident-free career. In 1957, a taconite pellet facility was built near the town of Hoyt Lakes, Minnesota. The ship became a regular visitor to the facility and began hauling taconite. The lengthening also increased its capacity to around 23,000 tons. In 1966, the Elton Hoyt II was sold to Pickands Mather and Co. It remained in their fleet until 1973.

Conversion to a self-unloader 
23 years later, in 1980, Elton Hoyt II was again upgraded, this time in a conversion to a self-unloading vessel. It was converted at the Toledo-based American Ship Building Co. In 1985, Johnstown, which had not been converted to a self unloader, was sold for scrap. The third ship, Sparrows Point, was converted in 1980 and sailed as Buckeye until 2008, when that ship sustained severe damage to its engines and shortly after was converted again by the Rand Logistics/Lower Lakes Towing company into the barge Menominee, leaving Michipicoten the last fully functional member of its class.

Throughout the 1980s and 1990s, the Elton Hoyt II saw varied use. For some seasons, it did not sail. In the 1990s, the vessel was certified to carry grain, and made several trips to Buffalo, New York, in addition to its regular loads of taconite.

Sale 
On April 10, 2003, it was announced that Elton Hoyt II was sold to Lower Lakes Towing, a Canadian shipping company. It was renamed Michipicoten after the Canadian river of the same name. The name Michipicoten means "Big bluffs" in the Ojibwe language and refers to the hills near the river. It was christened on May 24, 2003, in Sarnia, Ontario. The ship began supplying taconite to the Algoma Steel Mill in Sault Ste. Marie, Ontario.

In December 2010, Michipicoten was laid up in Sarnia. Over the course of several months, its steam turbine system was replaced with a MaK 6M32C 6-cylinder  diesel engine and a new pitch propeller. The cost of the upgrade was around US$15 million.

References

1952 ships
Merchant ships of Canada
Great Lakes freighters
Ships built in Quincy, Massachusetts